Roseville station is an Amtrak train station in Roseville, California, United States. It serves the California Zephyr and Capitol Corridor lines. It is located at 201 Pacific Street and is unstaffed. The design of the two-story building pays homage to Southern Pacific Railroad stations from the early 20th century.

References

External links

Roseville Amtrak Station (USA RailGuide -- TrainWeb)

Amtrak stations in Placer County, California
Buildings and structures in Roseville, California
Railway stations in the United States opened in 1994
Former Southern Pacific Railroad stations in California